Lock and Dam No. 8 is a lock and dam located near Genoa, Wisconsin on the Upper Mississippi River near river mile 679.2 in the United States It was constructed and was put into operation by April 1937. The site then underwent major rehabilitation from 1989 through 2003. The lock and dam are owned and operated by the St. Paul District of the United States Army Corps of Engineers-Mississippi Valley Division.

See also
 Public Works Administration dams list
 Upper Mississippi River National Wildlife and Fish Refuge

External links

U.S. Army Corps of Engineers, St. Paul District: Lock and Dam 8
U.S. Army Corps of Engineers, St. Paul District: Lock and Dam 8 brochure
USGS Reach 1, Pool 8

Mississippi River locks
Driftless Area
Buildings and structures in Houston County, Minnesota
Buildings and structures in Vernon County, Wisconsin
Dams in Minnesota
Dams in Wisconsin
United States Army Corps of Engineers dams
Transport infrastructure completed in 1937
Roller dams
Gravity dams
Dams on the Mississippi River
Mississippi Valley Division
Historic American Engineering Record in Minnesota
Historic American Engineering Record in Wisconsin
Locks of Minnesota
Locks of Wisconsin